Namo Venkatesa ( Hail Venkatesa) is a 2010 Indian Telugu-language comedy film written and directed by Srinu Vytla from a story written by Gopimohan. Produced by 14 Reels Entertainment and Suresh Productions, it stars Venkatesh and Trisha  and Brahmanandam, Mukesh Rishi, Subbaraju, Akash, and Ali in supporting roles. The music was composed by Devi Sri Prasad with cinematography by Prasad Murella and editing by M. R. Varma. The film released on 14 January 2010.

Plot
Venkataramana a.k.a. Venky is a ventriloquist. He is a naive and good adult, and everyone in his association usually likes him. An astrologer named Palasa predicts that if he does not get married in one month, he will be a single man forever. Venky goes to Paris as part of a group to perform for NRIs, where he meets Paris Prasad and his gang. They fool everyone and try to avoid giving them remuneration. Venky manages them and gets his and his troops' payment. Later, Venky meets Pooja, the niece of Prasad, and falls in love. Though Pooja has no feelings for Venky, Prasad tells him that Pooja too loves him, just for fun.

Slowly, Pooja and Venky become friends, and Pooja gets an emergency call from India, where she finds out that her family, especially her grandfather arranged her marriage with Bhadrappa (Subbaraju), the son of her uncle, Changala Rayudu. She does not want to marry him and calls Prasad for help. She offers money to him if he could take her back to Paris. Prasad takes the risk as he needs money to repay the bank loan. He asks Venky for help, telling him that Pooja wants to marry him, but her family wants her to marry Bhadrappa. Venky innocently believes him and comes to Rayalaseema to take Pooja away.

There, Venky introduces himself to everyone as Praneeth and offers the partnership of a fake multimillion-dollar factory. In the hope of that partnership, everyone treats him nicely and makes minor changes in their household to please him. Prasad tells Pooja that he fooled Venky and asks her to go with his drama to escape from that place. Though she does not want to fool Venky, she reluctantly agrees to Prasad's plan as she needs to get out of there desperately. Actually, she loves an NRI named Ajay and wants to elope with him.

Finally, Venky succeeds to trick them and take Pooja and Prasad away. Pooja plans to escape with Ajay to Europe, but Venky takes them to his area in Hyderabad. He introduces his family, which includes his uncles Narayana and Malesh Yadav. Everybody receives Pooja affectionately and makes arrangements for their wedding. Prasad and Ajay try to tell them the truth but could not succeed.

Bhaddrapa's grandfather overhears the conversation of Pooja's mother with Pooja on the phone and devises a plan to call them to their village and kill Venky. They tell Pooja that they will conduct their wedding within their place and asks her to come back. However, Venky ends up coming with his full family and friends, roughly a few hundred, failing their plan to kill him. Finally, he discovers that Pooja loves Ajay and not him. Though devastated, he still wishes her happiness and saves them from their uncle's gang. Seeing his selfless love, Pooja's uncle and others stop fighting him and reconcile. At the end, however, Pooja realises that she loves Venky. Ajay understands this and leaves the decision in her hands. Finally, Pooja and Venky marry with everyone's blessings.

Cast

 Venkatesh as Venkataramana a.k.a. Venky / Praneeth
 Trisha as Pooja
 Brahmanandam as Paris Prasad, Pooja's uncle
 Mukesh Rishi as Chengala Rayudu / Shankar Thakur
 Kota Srinivasa Rao as Malesh Yadav, Venky's uncle
 Chandra Mohan as Narayana, Venky's uncle
 Telangana Shakuntala as Venky's aunt
 Jaya Prakash Reddy as Bhaddrapa's grandfather
 Subbaraju as Bhaddrappa
 Akash as Ajay, Pooja's friend
 Ali as Sheikh Raj
 M. S. Narayana as Palasa: An astrologist
 Dharmavarapu Subramanyam as Bhaddrappa's grandfather's brother-in-law
 Y. Kasi Viswanath as Ramanujam
 Master Bharath as Puppy
 Srinivasa Reddy as Murthy
 Sivannarayana Naripeddi as Priest
 Sudha as Pooja's aunt 
 Vinaya Prasad as Pooja's aunt 
 Pragathi as Pooja's aunt
 Surekha Vani as Prasad's wife
 Jeeva as Soda Sambayya
 Gundu Sudharshan as Chary
 Raghu Babu as Srinivas
 Pruthvi Raj as Prasad's gang member
 Surya as Prasad's gang member 
 Siva Reddy as Srinivas's student
 Kalpika Ganesh
 Giridhar as Srinivas's student
 Sravan as Bhairagi
 Jenny
 Fish Venkat 
 Satya Prakash
 Banerjee
 Bharat
 Delhi Rajeswari
 Kalpana
 Rekki
 Sandya

Soundtrack

The music for the film was composed by Devi Sri Prasad in his second collaboration with actor Venkatesh after Tulasi. Lyrics were written by Ramajogayya Sastry. The soundtrack was released by Aditya Music.

Production and release 
The European segment of the film and a couple of songs were shot at various sites in Austria including Salzburg and Vienna.

The film released on 14 January 2010.

References

External links
 

Films directed by Srinu Vaitla
2010 action comedy films
Indian romantic comedy films
Indian action comedy films
2010 romantic comedy films
2010 films
Films scored by Devi Sri Prasad
2010s Telugu-language films
Films shot in Iceland